Trond Olsen (born 5 February 1984) is a Norwegian former footballer.

Club career
Born in Lyngen, the left-footed former under-21 international was picked up by Lillestrøm SK after the 2005 relegation of his former team Bodø/Glimt. Olsen returned to Bodø/Glimt later in the same year.

In 2006 Olsen played for  the Sápmi national football team in the unofficial VIVA World Cup for the non-members of the FIFA or the UEFA organizations.

In the 2007 Norwegian Cup, Olsen scored four goals. In 2007, Bodø/Glimt promoted to the top division. The following season, he scored 10 goals in the league and had 14 assists. Olsen transferred to Rosenborg before the 2009 season. He joined Viking in August 2011.

On 23 January 2014 he returned to Bodø/Glimt on a three-year contract. Olsen signed with Sogndal on 15 August 2018, after failing to play for the first team.

On 1 February 2019 it was announced, that Olsen's contract with Sogndal  had been terminated by mutual consent. On 29 December 2019 it was announced, that Olsen is retirering from football.

International career
He made his international debut for the Norway national football team against Ukraine in 2008.

Career statistics

Club
Source:

Honours

Club
Rosenborg
Tippeligaen: 2009, 2010

References

1984 births
Living people
People from Lyngen
Norwegian footballers
Norway international footballers
Norway under-21 international footballers
FK Bodø/Glimt players
Lillestrøm SK players
Rosenborg BK players
Viking FK players
Sogndal Fotball players
Eliteserien players
Norwegian First Division players
Association football midfielders
Sportspeople from Troms og Finnmark